This article lists the British National Party's election results in the UK parliamentary, Scottish parliamentary and Welsh Assembly elections, as well as in the European Parliament elections and at a local level.

United Kingdom elections

Summary of general election performance 

* Note: Until 1985, a deposit was saved on securing 12½% of the votes cast; from 1985, this was reduced to 5%.

General election, 9 June 1983
This was the first general election after the formation of the BNP following the disintegration of the National Front (NF) in the early 1980s. The BNP stood 53 candidates in order to be eligible for the five-minute national television broadcast offered to all parties running fifty candidates or more. Although the party did not anticipate winning any seats (as was the case) the election was pivotal in ensuring that its profile was raised, with 13 million viewers watching the broadcast. The NF itself contested 61 seats, a significant drop from the 303 it had contested in 1979. Only three constituencies (Hackney S & Shoreditch, Islington S & Finsbury and Worthing) were contested by both parties and in all three the NF beat the BNP. However, their combined vote in each of these constituencies was roughly half of what the NF had secured previously.

38 of the seats contested by the BNP had been contested by the NF in 1979. However, the BNP vote in all but one was lower than the NF had previously achieved. (The exception was Carmarthen: NF 149 in 1979; BNP 154 in 1983.)

BNP results ranged from 94 to 632 votes. Its share of votes ranged from 0.2% to 1.3%.

By-elections, 1983–87

General election, 11 June 1987
With party finances strained, leader John Tyndall decided not to fight this election. The party's Bromley officer Alf Waite and West Kent chief Michael Easter both broke rank and stood as candidates and, despite attempts by Tyndall to maintain unity, some of Waite and Easter's supporters split from the BNP to join the Flag Group after the election.

General election, 9 April 1992
Although a wider slate of candidates was put forward than in 1987, the party concentrated its campaigning efforts on the East London constituencies of Bethnal Green and Stepney and Bow and Poplar on the back of some relatively strong performances in local elections in the early 1990s. The party's first elected representative to a borough council, Derek Beackon, would be elected in this area the following year.

BNP results ranged from 121 to 1310 votes. Its share of votes ranged from 0.3% to 3.6%.

By-elections, 1992–97

General election, 1 May 1997
Both Tyndall and Tony Lecomber felt that recruitment of new members was of central importance to the growth of the BNP and it was agreed that a larger scale general election campaign was needed in order to accomplish this. The party spent £60,000 on their election campaign, although ultimately it had no great impact on volume of membership.

BNP results ranged from 149 to 3350 votes. Its share of votes ranged from 0.4% to 7.5%.

By-elections, 1997–2001

General election, 7 June 2001
On the back of an intense local campaign that had been bolstered by the tensions around the 2001 Oldham race riots, the BNP secured their best ever general election result in Oldham West and Royton where party leader Nick Griffin secured 16.4% of the vote.

BNP results ranged from 278 to 6,552 votes. Its share of votes ranged from 0.8% to 16.4%.

General election, 5 May 2005
BNP results ranged from 376 to 5,066 votes. Its share of votes ranged from 0.8% to 17.0%. In total 34 BNP candidates polled 5% or more and saved their deposit. The highest percentage was achieved in Barking by Richard Barnbrook, later to be elected to the London Assembly in 2008 when the BNP passed the 5% threshold and thus qualified for a single seat.

By-elections, 2005–10

General election, 6 May 2010
The BNP fielded 338 candidates (including 19 in Wales and 14 in Scotland but none in Northern Ireland), nearly three times the number in 2005. Leader Nick Griffin came third in Barking – the constituency it had targeted heavily – while the party lost all 12 of its seats on Barking and Dagenham council. In total 73 BNP candidates polled 5% or more and saved their deposit. The election results followed a campaign in which the BNP website was closed down by its designer, the party's publicity director was arrested on suspicion of threatening to kill Griffin and a candidate in London was filmed fighting in the street with a group of Asian teenagers. Votes polled ranged from 150 to 6,620. The percentage of votes ranged from 0.4% to 14.6%. The average was 1.9%.

By-elections, 2010–15

General election, 7 May 2015

By-elections, 2015—2017

General election, 8 June 2017

General election, 12 December 2019

London Assembly and Mayor elections

Mayor of London

London Assembly

Local elections
The BNP's first electoral success came in 1993, when Derek Beackon was returned as a councillor in Millwall, London. He lost his seat in elections the following year. The next BNP success in local elections was not until the 2002 local elections, when three BNP candidates gained seats on Burnley council.

In 2000, the BNP fielded 17 candidates in 12 councils and polled 3,022 votes. The average share of votes in wards contested was 8%.
In 2001, the BNP fielded 4 candidates in three councils and polled 867 votes, with an average share of 4% in the wards contested.
In 2002, the BNP fielded 67 candidates and polled 30,998 votes in 26 local councils. The BNP average share of votes was 16%. Three BNP candidates were elected for the first time in Burnley with an average share of 28.1%.
In 2003, the BNP fielded a total of 217 candidates in 71 local authorities in England and Scotland. The party won a total of 13 council seats, polling over 101,221 votes and averaging 17% of the vote in those wards where it fielded candidates.

Later in 2003, the BNP won two local by-elections. In the Heckmondwike ward of Kirklees Council in August, David Exley polled 1,607 votes (44%). In September, Nick Geri won the Grays Riverside ward of Thurrock council, polling 552 votes (38%). Later in Burnley, the number of councillors increased, making the BNP briefly the second largest party and the official opposition on that council, a position it lost after the resignation of a BNP councillor who had been disciplined by the party. The BNP stood in the subsequent by-election.

In 2004, the BNP had 312 candidates stand for election in 59 local authorities in England and Wales, including 25 candidates in Sunderland, 24 in Birmingham and 23 in Leeds. The BNP won 14 council seats and polled 190,200 votes.
In 2005, the BNP fielded 41 candidates in 18 councils and polled 21,775 votes, averaging 11% share in the contested wards.

The party's biggest election success to date was a gain of 52% of the vote in the Goresbrook ward of Barking in the 2004 local elections. The victorious councillor, Daniel Kelley, retired just 10 months later, claiming he had been an outcast within the council. A new election was held in June 2005, in which the seat was regained by the Labour candidate.

In 2006, the BNP polled a total of 229,389 votes, having fielded 363 candidates in 78 local authorities across England. The party averaged 18% of the votes in wards contested. The BNP fielded 40 candidates in Birmingham, 25 in Sunderland, 23 in Kirklees and 22 in Leeds. 33 BNP councillors were elected; four lost their seats and the party gained a seat with the defection of a Conservative councillor in Lincolnshire bringing its total to 49.

The biggest gain in the local elections on 4 May 2006, was in Barking and Dagenham where the BNP gained 17% of the vote. The party also won three seats in Epping Forest, three in Stoke-on-Trent, three in Sandwell, two in Burnley, two in Kirklees, and single seats in Bradford, Havering, Solihull, Redditch, Redbridge, Pendle and Leeds. The same year, the BNP also gained its first parish councillor in Wales when Mike Howard of Rhewl Mostyn, Flintshire, previously an Independent, joined the BNP.

In the 2007 local elections, the BNP polled 292,911 votes. It won 10 seats with a net gain of one. The party fielded a record of 744 candidates in 148 councils across England and Scotland. This was more than double the number of candidates fielded in 2006; they scored on average 13% of the votes in the wards which they contested.

In summary of BNP councillors from 2000 to 2007: from 2000 to 2001 the BNP had none, in 2002 it had three, by 2003 it had
16 local councillors, this increased to 21 by 2005, in 2006 the biggest gain saw BNP's councillors rise to 48, and by 2007 to 50.

In 2007, the number of BNP councillors fell slowly due to resignations and expulsions, several of them associated with a failed leadership challenge in the summer. By the end of the year, the number was 42. In 2008, however, the BNP increased its councillors to 55.

In 2008, the BNP polled an average of 14% across 593 wards contested having fielded 612 candidates. The total number of votes polled by the BNP stood at 240,968. The party gained 15 seats and had 55 councillors in total.

The BNP did not field as many candidates for the 2009 local elections, because of its focus on the European Parliament election the same year, but for the first time won representation at county council level, winning three such seats.  A seat in a local by-election in Sevenoaks district, Kent, was also won by the BNP.

About four BNP councillors resigned at the end of 2009, leaving the party with 54 councillors by 2010. In the May 2010 local elections, 26 BNP councillors lost their seats, leaving the party with 28 seats overall. In Barking and Dagenham, the party lost all 12 seats won in 2006.

In the 2011 local elections, the BNP fielded 268 candidates and defended 13 council seats. It lost 11 of these seats, including all 5 of their councillors in Stoke-on-Trent. Two councillors were re-elected, one in Queensbury, West Yorkshire, and the other in Charnwood, Leicestershire, but no new seats were gained.
In the 2011 Northern Ireland local elections, the party fielded 4 candidates; two in Larne and one each in Castlereagh and Newtownabbey.  They received a total 491 votes, 0.1% of the total, and gained no council seats.

Between the 2011 and 2012 elections, the BNP lost a number of councillors to resignations, such as in Nuneaton and Bedworth and Amber Valley. This left them with 8 councillors in the run-up to the 2012 election.

In the 2012 local elections, the BNP polled an average of 9% across 59 council wards, and lost all 6 seats that it was defending in that election. They were left with 2 seats in areas without contests.

In the 2013 elections, the BNP fielded 99 candidates and was defending one seat in Lancashire. The party lost its only county council seat and did not gain any others, leaving it with just 2 borough seats in Charnwood and Pendle.

In 2014, the party retained its seat in Pendle, winning by just 6 votes. In the London local elections, the party ran 32 candidates- six in Enfield, five in Croydon and Greenwich, four in Barking and Dagenham, three in Bexley, two in Bromley, Ealing, Havering and Hillingdon, and one in Kingston upon Thames. Their most successful candidate was Kevin Layzell in Havering, who received 556 votes. Overall, the party received 8,222 votes, 0.3%, and no candidate was elected. Elsewhere. the party ran a total of 61 candidates; 41 in metropolitan boroughs (thirteen in Coventry City Council, seven in Stockport, five in Salford, three in St Helens and Birmingham, two each in Manchester, Tameside and Wolverhampton, and one each in Bolton, Dudley, Walsall and Wigan), 2 in unitary authorities (both in Derby) and 18 in non-metropolitan districts (eight in Worcestershire, three in Nuneaton and Bedworth, two each in Amber Valley, Burnley and Pendle, and one in Exeter). Their best performance was in Stockport, where Paul Bennett received 419 votes. The party received 8,505 votes overall and did not win any new seats, but successfully defended their seat in Pendle.

In the 2014 Northern Ireland local elections, the BNP nominated 2 candidates, both in the Coast Road electoral area of Mid and East Antrim. They received a total of 173 votes, 3.2% of the total for that electoral area, and neither were elected.

In 2015, the BNP sought re-election to their Charnwood seat. Incumbent councillor Catherine Ann Marie Duffy was defeated by 185 votes. Nationally, 16 BNP candidates stood for election; 3 in metropolitan boroughs (two in Salford, one in Manchester), 1 in unitary authorities (Derby) and 12 in non-metropolitan districts (four in Worcester City, two in Northampton borough, and one each in Charnwood, East Northamptonshire, Maldon, Burnley, Exeter and Pendle). The party received 2,074 votes, their best result being the seat they were defending in Charnwood. They gained no new seats and lost the one they were defending.

In the 2016 elections, the party fielded two candidates in Burnley, and one each in Barnsley, Tameside, Havant and Pendle. They received a combined total of 1,005 votes, and none were elected.

In the 2017 local elections, the BNP ran seven candidates; five in Essex (two in Pitsea, one in Halstead, one in Maldon and one in Heybridge & Tollesbury), one in Hampshire (Hayling Island) and one in Lincolnshire (Louth South). They received a combined total of 923 votes and none of them were elected.

The last remaining BNP councilor, Brian Parker of Pendle, did not run for re-election in 2018. Since no other candidates were elected, this marked the first time since 2002 that the party had no elected representation. Nationally, the party focused on that year's London local elections. It ran fifteen candidates overall; five in Bexley, three in Croydon, two in Barking and Dagenham, and one each in Ealing, Greenwich, Havering, Hillingdon and Lewisham. Their best single candidate performance was in Bexley, where Michael Jones received 398 votes. Overall, the party received a combined total of 2,329 votes, 0.1% of the total, and no candidate was elected. Elsewhere, the party only fielded one candidate, in Exeter, who received 34 votes and was not elected.

The BNP ran just two candidates in the 2019 local elections, one in Sevenoaks and one in Broxbourne. They received a combined total of 317 votes and neither were elected.

The party ran 2 candidates in the 2021 local elections; one in a by-election for Croydon and one in West Northamptonshire. They received a combined total of 147 votes and neither were elected.

European Parliament
The 1999 European elections were the first time European elections contested by the BNP which qualified for a party electoral broadcast after standing in every region except Wales. With regional votes of between 0.4% and 1.7% (1.13% nationally), it failed to win any seats and lost all its deposits.

In the 2004 European elections, the BNP vote increased by 3.9%, saving deposits in every region except Scotland. No seats were taken.

In the 2009 European elections, the BNP won two seats. Andrew Brons was elected in the Yorkshire and the Humber with 9.8% of the vote and Nick Griffin in North West England, with 8% of the vote. Nationally, the BNP received 6.26%.

In the 2014 European elections, the BNP's share of the vote collapsed nationally to 1.1%. Brons had already left the BNP to set up the British Democratic Party and did not stand. Griffin failed to be re-elected.

They did not run any candidates in the 2019 European elections.

1999 European elections

2004 European elections

2009 European elections

2014 European elections

Scottish Parliament
In UK parliamentary elections, the BNP had only ever contested six Scottish seats – Clydesdale (1992 and 1997), Edinburgh West (1992), Glasgow Central (2005), Glasgow Govan (1997), Glasgow North East (2005, 2009 by election) and Glasgow Shettleston (1983 and 1997) – until the 2010 General election, when it contested 13 which covered all Glasgow constituencies and parts of the north-east but failed to save any deposits.

In the 2003 Scottish Parliament election, the BNP only stood one candidate, Peter Appleby, in the Glasgow electoral region; he polled 2,344 votes (1.1%), 0.001% of the nationwide vote.

In the 2007 Scottish Parliament election the BNP competed in all the Scottish Parliamentary electoral regions, polling 1.2% of the vote (seventh place). It failed to save any of its deposits.

In the 2011 Scottish Parliament election the BNP fielded 32 candidates – four in each of the eight electoral regions. It gained 15,580 votes (0.78%) throughout Scotland ending in 11th place. The party lost all deposits in all regions with no elected members and its nationwide vote fell by 0.42%, being beaten by UKIP, the Scottish Senior Citizens Unity Party, the Scottish Christian Party and the Socialist Labour Party.

They did not run any candidates in the 2016 Scottish Parliament election.

Scottish Parliament election (3 May 2007)

Source: BBC News

Scottish Parliament election (5 May 2011)

Source: BBC News

National Assembly for Wales/Senedd

In the 2003 Assembly election, the BNP only stood one candidate, Pauline Gregory, in the South Wales East region, who obtained 3,210 votes (1.89%) (less than 0.01% of the total).

In the 2007 Assembly election, it stood 20 candidates with all 4 for each region, they finished 6th nationwide with 42,197 votes (4.3%). The Welsh nationalist party Plaid Cymru came second to the Labour Party. The Liberal Democrats came fourth having achieved 2.5 times the vote of the BNP and earning six seats. The BNP was the only minor party to save its deposits in the electoral regions with one in the North Wales region and the other in the South Wales West region.

In the 2011 election, the BNP stood 27 candidates – 7 for the constituencies and 20 for the additional regions in which there would be 4 candidates for each of the 5 regions. Two candidates, in Swansea East and Islwyn, respectively, saved their deposits for the first time ever in a Welsh Assembly constituency. Despite its hope to win an Assembly seat, the BNP's nationwide vote in the regions fell by 1.9% from 4.3% which it gained in the 2007 Assembly elections to 2.6% losing all regional deposits and being beaten by the Greens, the UKIP and even the Socialist Labour Party.

They did not run any candidates in the elections of 2016 or 2021.

Welsh Assembly election (3 May 2007)

Source: BBC News

Welsh Assembly election (5 May 2011)

Source: BBC News

Northern Ireland Legislative Assembly

Northern Ireland Legislative Assembly election, (5 May 2011)
The BNP stood 3 candidates for the Northern Ireland Legislative Assembly elections for the first time. They did not run any in the 2016 or 2017 Assembly elections.

Source: BBC News

References

History of the British National Party
Election results by party in the United Kingdom
Far-right politics in the United Kingdom